Jim Easton (born 3 September 1940) is a Scottish former professional association footballer and manager. He played for Hibernian and Dundee and was player/manager of Queen of the South. He also played for the Miami Toros in the NASL and also managed the Vancouver Whitecaps for their first two seasons.

Club career
Easton was with Drumchapel Amateurs before joining the senior ranks with Hibernian. He was with Hibernian from 1960 to 1964, making 79 league appearances in which he scored one goal. He also played in European ties, including a 3–2 victory against FC Barcelona at Easter Road.

Easton joined Dundee and was there until 1971. During his time with Dundee, he made 168 league appearances in which he again scored once. He also played 11 Scottish cup games and 22 league cup games. He also played a number of European cup games scoring the winning goal against Zurich in 1967.

Easton was appointed Queen of the South player / manager in May 1971. He made 57 league appearances for the Dumfries club in which he scored twice. He left Palmerston Park in March of his second season after which he moved to Canada.

Jim Easton played for the Miami Toros in 1973 in the original North American Soccer League. He then moved on to expansion Vancouver Whitecaps as manager from 1974 to 1975, and saw good success during his tenure with a small budget and local players.

International career
While at Hibernian, he gained one Scotland under-23 cap.

Personal life
Jim is married to Rae Easton (née Coffey) to which they have three children; Jim Easton Jr. (a former NASL player himself), Stewart Easton and Alan Easton; and four granddaughters, Kaitlyn, Nicola, Eliana and Gabriela and one grandson Ewan. He currently resides in North Vancouver BC Canada.

References

External links
NASL stats

1940 births
Living people
Scottish footballers
Association football central defenders
Hibernian F.C. players
Drumchapel Amateur F.C. players
Dundee F.C. players
Miami Toros players
North American Soccer League (1968–1984) players
North American Soccer League (1968–1984) coaches
Scottish Football League players
Queen of the South F.C. managers
Queen of the South F.C. players
Scottish football managers
Scottish expatriate football managers
Scottish emigrants to Canada
Scotland under-23 international footballers
Scottish Football League managers
Vancouver Whitecaps (1974–1984) coaches
Scottish expatriate sportspeople in the United States
Expatriate soccer players in the United States
Scottish expatriate footballers